Valavil is an enclave in Shan Valavil.

References

External links
 

Mahe district